Founded in 1878 by Simon Seward, the Petersburg, Virginia-based Seward Trunk Co. was once the nation's largest manufacturer of steamers, trunks and luggage. In 1967, Seward was purchased by the Dayco Corporation, the former Dayton Rubber Company, of Dayton, Ohio. The company is now a unit of Advantus, Corp. of Jacksonville, Florida which purchased the former owner, Mercury Luggage(also of Jacksonville) in 2016.  Seward trunks are sold by fine retailers throughout the USA.  

The former Seward luggage factory at 422-424 High Street in Petersburg is on the National Register of Historic Places and was under renovation for residences, the first of which opened in 2006.  The second phase of the project would have included both residential and commercial space.

On January 16, 2018, at 5a.m, the old building suffered a massive fire and burned down.

External links
Mercury Luggage Corporate Site
Antique Trunk Manufacturer History
Story on Condominium Project
Samsonite carry on luggage 
Papers of Dayco Corp. at Wright State University

Companies based in Jacksonville, Florida
American companies established in 1878
History of Dayton, Ohio
Luggage manufacturers
1878 establishments in Virginia